Kyle Dargan is an American writer and editor. He is the author of six poetry collections. Dargan is currently an associate professor of literature and the assistant director of creative writing at American University, as well as Books Editor for the Wondaland Arts Society.

Biography
Dargan was born in Newark, New Jersey.  He received a BA from the University of Virginia and MFA from Indiana University.

Dargan's first four poetry collections were published by University of Georgia Press. His first collection, The Listening (2004), was the recipient of the Cave Canem Poetry Prize in 2004. His second collection, Bouquet of Hungers (2007), was awarded the Hurston/Wright Legacy Award in poetry in 2008. "Logorrhea Dementia" was published in 2010 and Honest Engine was published in 2015. Dargan's fifth book, Anagnorisis, (Triquarterly, 2018), won the Lenore Marshall Poetry Prize from the Academy of American Poets in 2018.

Dargan is currently an associate professor of literature and the assistant director of creative writing at American University. He is  the founder and editor of POST NO ILLS magazine. Dargan lives in Washington D.C.

Selected publications
 The Listening, (University of Georgia Press, 2004) 
 Bouquet of Hungers, (University of Georgia Press, 2007) 
 Logorrhea Dementia: A Self-Diagnosis, (University of Georgia Press, 2010) 
 Honest Engine, (University of Georgia Press, 2015) 
 Anagnorisis, (Northwestern University Press, 2018) 
 Panzer Herz, A Live Dissection, (Northwestern University Press, 2023)

Awards
 2003 — Cave Canem Poetry Prize, The Listening
 2008 — Hurston/Wright Legacy Award in Poetry, Bouquet of Hungers
 2019 — Lenore Marshall Poetry Prize, Anagnorisis

References

Living people
Writers from Newark, New Jersey
Indiana University alumni
University of Virginia alumni
American University faculty and staff
American writers
African-American poets
Year of birth missing (living people)
21st-century African-American people